Nawaf al-Moussawi was as of 2004 head of Hezbollah's office of international relations. He mainly speaks on behalf of Hezbollah to Western media sources.

References

Living people
Al-Moussawi family
Year of birth missing (living people)
Place of birth missing (living people)
Hezbollah members